Phuwiangosaurus (meaning "Phu Wiang lizard") is a genus of titanosaur dinosaur from the Early Cretaceous (Valanginian-Hauterivian) Sao Khua Formation of Thailand. The type species, P. sirindhornae, was described by Martin, Buffetaut, and Suteethorn in a 1993 press release and was formally named in 1994. The species was named to honor Princess Maha Chakri Sirindhorn of Thailand, who was interested in the geology and palaeontology of Thailand, while the genus was named after the Phu Wiang area, where the fossil was discovered.

 

Phuwiangosaurus was originally assigned to Titanosauria, but more recent studies have placed it in a more basal position within the Titanosauriformes. Phylogenetic analyses presented by D'Emic (2012), Mannion et al. (2013), and Mocho et al. (2014) resolve Phuwiangosaurus within the Euhelopodidae, alongside genera such as Euhelopus and Tangvayosaurus. Other analyses have failed to find support for such a grouping, including some finding it to be paraphyletic at the base of Somphospondyli.

Description

Its mass has been estimated at 17 tonnes. The teeth are slender and peg-like, with the tooth height from base to tip being on average over four times greater than the width of the base of the tooth. They are slenderer than the teeth of other euhelopodids, with their proportions more closely resembling the teeth of diplodocoids and titanosaurs. The neck of Phuwiangosaurus was probably composed of 13 vertebrae. The lengths of the vertebrae increase up to the middle of the neck, with the eighth cervical vertebra being the longest, and then decrease again. The cervical neural spines are bifurcated from the seventh cervical vertebra onward. The sacrum was composed of five vertebrae.

References

Works cited

Macronarians
Early Cretaceous dinosaurs of Asia
Cretaceous Thailand
Fossils of Thailand
Fossil taxa described in 1994
Taxa named by Éric Buffetaut
Taxa named by Varavudh Suteethorn